Tammi Reiss (born April 2, 1970) is an American actress and former professional basketball player. She is currently the coach for the University of Rhode Island. Reiss is a native of New York state. Reiss graduated from the University of Virginia in 1992 with a major in sports management. As a professional, she was chosen in the first round of the first-ever WNBA draft, and she played for two years with the Utah Starzz.

Biography
Reiss was born in New York, and she attended Eldred Central School, a high-school in the area. Reiss began playing in her high-school's team as an eighth-grader. She led Eldred Central to a state championship in 1988, and finished her high school basketball career with 2,871 points scored. That total places her, as of 2014, in fifth place among New York state's all-time high school girls' scoring leaders. At Eldred Central, Reiss was coached by Ken Bjorn and Frank Kean, with boys' team coach Paul Tylawsky, a former basketball player with a Boston Celtics affiliate, also training her three times a week.

Reiss became a fan of Magic Johnson, and her dad built her a home basketball court during this period, so that she could hone her skills in a safe environment.

At Eldred, Reiss established a single-game New York state girls' basketball record by scoring 51 points in one contest.

Reiss was also an accomplished runner during this period, her achievements in Track and Field including winning the state's Class D cross-country championship in 1983.

University of Virginia
Reiss received an athletic scholarship to the University of Virginia and played from 1989 to 1992. There, she teamed up with Dawn Staley and twins Heidi and Heather Burge. She was coached by Debbie Ryan. At the University of Virginia, Reiss became a three-time all American.

During her stellar college career, she was a four time all league honoree, leading her team to the NCAA Final Four three straight times while being named to the ACC women's championship all tournament squad twice, scoring 1,842 points and making 437 free throws (in both cases, placing in second place all time among women in the school's history) and scoring 139 three-point shots while making 41% of her shots from the three-point line, both of the latter all time school records for women's basketball.

Reiss got interested in acting during her stint at the University of Virginia, and she took a Drama 101 class there.

After college and the WNBA
Frustrated at the lack of a women's professional basketball league in the United States, Reiss returned to her college as an assistant coach. After two years, however, the WNBA had formed and Reiss was drafted in the first round (fifth pick) by the Utah Starzz.

Reiss had been scouted by the Starzz after she received a telephone call from WNBA president Val Ackerman, who invited her to attend a veteran tryout camp where WNBA teams would observe prospect players. The Starzz were impressed by her play.

Reiss played for the Starzz during the 1997 and 1998 WNBA seasons, averaging 7.2 points, 2.7 assists and 2.3 rebounds per game.

Coaching career
Reiss became assistant coach of the Starzz in 2001 and remained with the team through 2003 (staying with the team when it relocated to San Antonio, Texas as the San Antonio Silver Stars).

In 2002, Reiss was selected to the ACC's 50th anniversary women's basketball team.

In 2011, Reiss joined San Diego State as assistant coach of the Lady Aztecs basketball team. She helped direct the team to a sweep of the Mountain West regular season and championship, as well as a spot in the NCAA championship tournament.

In 2013, Reiss joined the Cal State-Fullerton as one of their women's basketball team's assistant coaches.

In 2015, Reiss joined the Syracuse staff as one of their women's basketball assistant coaches.

On April 18, 2019, she was named the 9th head coach in Rhode Island women's basketball history.

Acting career
Reiss debuted as an actress in a 1999 episode of the television comedy, Sister Sister (The Road Less Travelled). In 2002, she played one of the main characters, Vicki Sanchez, in the feature comedy film, Juwanna Mann. That same year, she played a coach in the made-for-television film Double Teamed.

She also appeared in Love and Basketball.

Outside basketball
Reiss is an avid public speaker in the Salt Lake City, Utah area, where she became based after she was signed by the Starzz. In the 1998 off-season, Reiss joined the Utah Jazz television broadcasting team. She also has a basketball camp and owns a business named Hoop Dreams, Inc, and one named T & R Management. Reiss has also worked as a personal trainer at Gold's Gym and as operations manager for ProTech.

WNBA statistics

|-
| style="text-align:left;"|1997
| style="text-align:left;"|Utah
| 28 || 26 || 29.7 || .312 || .297 || .764 || 2.8 || 3.1 || 0.8 || 0.1 || 2.2 || 7.7
|-
| style="text-align:left;"|1998
| style="text-align:left;"|Utah
| 22 || 17 || 21.7 || .403 || .296 || .655 || 1.8 || 2.2 || 0.5 || 0.0 || 1.1 || 6.5
|-
| style="text-align:left;"|Career
| style="text-align:left;"|2 years, 1 team
| 50 || 43 || 26.2 || .345 || .297 || .726 || 2.3 || 2.7 || 0.7 || 0.1 || 1.7 || 7.2

Head coaching record

References

External links
 Rhode Island Rams bio

1970 births
Living people
Actresses from New York City
All-American college women's basketball players
American women's basketball coaches
American women's basketball players
Basketball coaches from New York (state)
Basketball players from New York City
Virginia Cavaliers women's basketball coaches
Rhode Island Rams women's basketball coaches
San Diego State Aztecs women's basketball coaches
Syracuse Orange women's basketball coaches
Utah Starzz draft picks
Utah Starzz players
Virginia Cavaliers women's basketball players